Krotona was one of three important Theosophical centers in the United States during the early part of the 20th century. Originally built in Hollywood during 1912, the colony was eventually relocated to Ojai, California in 1926, where it operates today as the Krotona Institute of Theosophy. 

Located just off of State Route 33, the Krotona Institute holds regular classes and workshops on Theosophy, maintains an extensive library on the occult, and has a small bookstore.

The Hollywood Krotona building located at Primrose and Vista Del Mar was erected in 1919. Tenants have included Annie Sullivan Knudsen (sugar cane heiress), New Yorker Grace Shaw Duff, Henry Hotchener, Marie Russak, silver screen stars Mary Astor and Charlie Chaplin, and record producer Joshua Rumer of Invengo Records. When the Krotonians, spurred by Madame Blavatsky, found Hollywood suffocating their peace-filled theosophies, they decided to move to Ojai California and that is where they have been ever since.

It was about a year before the Primrose building went up that Alice Bailey, subsequently a Theosophical and Spiritualist leader and author, moved to a "cottage on Beechwood Drive," to be near the Krotona colony, from Pacific Grove, CA, near Monterey.  She had joined the Theosophical Lodge in Pacific Grove and was teaching and holding classes.  Not long before, she tells, she had left her original traditional Christian beliefs behind and soon after "discovered" "that there was a great and divine Plan," and that there are those "who are responsible for the working out of that Plan" by leading mankind, "stage by stage," down the centuries.  This "hierarchy of spiritual leaders" she calls the "Masters of the Wisdom," and they all report to and work with Christ, Jesus of Nazareth.  Her own Master, Lord K. H. or Koot Hoomi, had made visits to her every few years, starting she said in 1895, this being one of his many duties in his role as a pupil or assistant to the Christ.  K. H. was a master of love-wisdom.  Bailey said about 500 people were then part of the Krotona community, some living on the premises, and she began work there by emptying the garbage.  Soon she worked in the vegetarian kitchen and noted that some of the vegetarians felt smugly superior to carnivores, while others had no such notions.  She remained with the Theosophical Society until 1920.

References

Further reading

External links

Theosophical Society - North America

1912 establishments in California
Esotericism
Intentional communities in California
Populated places established in 1912
Theosophical Society